These are the results for the 2004 UCI Road World Championships bicycle race road race. The men's elite race was held on Sunday October 3, 2004 in Verona, Italy, over a total distance of 265.5 kilometres.

Final classification

References
Wielersite Results

Men's Road Race
UCI Road World Championships – Men's road race